The United States, represented by the United States Olympic & Paralympic Committee (USOPC), competed at the 2020 Summer Olympics in Tokyo. Originally scheduled to take place in the summer of 2020, the Games were postponed to July 23 to August 8, 2021, due to the COVID-19 pandemic. U.S. athletes have appeared in every Summer Olympics of the modern era, with the exception of the 1980 Summer Olympics in Moscow, which the U.S. boycotted. The opening ceremony flag-bearers for the United States were baseball player Eddy Alvarez and basketball player Sue Bird. Javelin thrower Kara Winger was the flag-bearer for the closing ceremony.

The country finished the Games with 113 medals, the most amongst all nations: 39 gold, 41 silver, and 33 bronze. These individual totals were each the highest of the Games, after a final-day tally of three gold medals (women's basketball, women's omnium, and women's volleyball) surpassed China's total of 38 golds. This was the third consecutive Summer Olympics that the U.S. was the medal table leader. Overall, the medal total was slightly lower than five years prior in Rio de Janeiro, where the United States won 46 gold and 121 total medals.

As Los Angeles will be the host city of the 2028 Summer Olympics, the United States, along with France, which is hosting the 2024 Summer Olympics in Paris, marched in the opening ceremony just before the host nation Japan.

Medalists

The following U.S. competitors won medals at the games. In the discipline sections below, the medalists' names are bolded.

|style="text-align:left;width:78%;vertical-align:top"|

|style="text-align:left;width:22%;vertical-align:top"|

 Athletes who participated in the heats only.

Competitors
The following is the list of number of competitors in the Games, including game-eligible alternates in team sports.

Archery

One U.S. archer qualified for the men's individual recurve by reaching the quarterfinal stage and obtaining one of the four available spots at the 2019 World Archery Championships in 's-Hertogenbosch, Netherlands. Another U.S. archer secured a spot in the women's individual recurve by winning the mixed team title at the 2019 Pan American Games in Lima, Peru. The athletes were selected after the Olympic Trials. Four more U.S. archers were named to the roster for Tokyo 2020 after successfully winning their places in the men's and women's team recurve at the 2021 Final Qualification Tournament in Paris, France.

Men

Women

Mixed

Artistic swimming

The United States fielded a squad of two artistic swimmers to compete in the women's duet event, by finishing fifth at the 2021 FINA Olympic Qualification Tournament in Barcelona, Spain.

Athletics (track and field)

U.S. athletes achieved the entry standards, either by qualifying time or by world ranking, in the following track and field events (up to a maximum of 3 athletes in each event). The team was selected based on the results of the 2020 United States Olympic Trials (June 18 to 27, 2021) held in Eugene, Oregon.

Six marathon runners (three per gender) were the first set of U.S. track and field athletes selected for the Games by virtue of their top three finish at the Olympic Team Trials in Atlanta, Georgia on February 29, 2020.

Following the completion of the Olympic Trials, 128 athletes (63 men and 65 women) were named to the U.S. track and field team for the Games, with sprinter and multiple medalist Allyson Felix and marathon runner Abdihakem Abdirahman, the oldest US Olympic runner in history (aged 47), competing at their fifth Olympics and another sprinter Erriyon Knighton establishing himself as the youngest (aged 17) in nearly six decades. Apart from Felix and Knighton, the U.S. team also featured three Olympic champions from Rio 2016, namely middle-distance runner Matthew Centrowitz, Jr. (men's 1500 m), hurdler Dalilah Muhammad, and shot put world record holder Ryan Crouser.

The fastest American woman in the 100 meters dash Sha'Carri Richardson missed the Olympics due to a positive test for marijuana, two-time pole vault world champion Sam Kendricks was out with COVID-19, 2016 110m hurdles gold medalist Brianna Rollins-McNeal was suspended for missed drug tests, and two-time defending gold medalist and 2019 world champion in triple jump Christian Taylor was out due to injury. The U.S. lost some races where it either had world champions and world record holders competing. Those included 100m specialist Trayvon Bromell, owning the fastest time in 100 meters in 2021, who was eliminated in the semifinals, 2019 world champion Noah Lyles who finished third in the 200 meters, and 2019 world champion and world record holder Grant Holloway who won silver in the 100m hurdles.

Overall, the U.S. topped the medal table in track and field events with 7 gold medals, 12 silver medals, 7 bronze medals, and 26 total medals. Sydney McLaughlin and Athing Mu both won two gold medals to lead the U.S. track and field athletes. McLaughlin won the gold medal in the 400 m hurdles with a world record time.

Track & road events
Men

Women

Mixed

 Athletes who participated in the heats only.

Field events
Men

Women

Combined events – Men's decathlon 

Combined events – Women's heptathlon

Badminton

The United States entered four badminton players into the Olympic tournament. Beiwen Zhang was selected among the top 40 individual shuttlers to compete in the women's singles based on the BWF World Race to Tokyo Rankings. On the men's side, Timothy Lam and Chew brothers Phillip and Ryan received an invitation from the Badminton World Federation to play in the singles and doubles events, respectively, as the next highest-ranked shuttler or pair outside of direct qualifying position. The team was supported at the Olympic Games by coach Ding Chao and team leader Alistair Casey.

Baseball

The U.S. baseball team qualified for the Olympics by winning the Americas qualifying event.

Summary

Team roster
 Men's team event – 1 team of 24 players

Group play

Round 2

Round 2 repechage

Semifinal

Gold medal game

Basketball

The United States men's basketball team won their fourth consecutive Olympic gold medal, the women's basketball team won their seventh consecutive Olympic gold, and the women's 3x3 basketball team won Olympic gold in the first edition of that event.

5×5 basketball
Summary

Men's tournament

The U.S. men's basketball team qualified for the Olympics by advancing to the quarterfinal stage as one of the two top-ranked squads from the Americas at the 2019 FIBA World Cup in China.

Team roster

Group play

Quarterfinal

Semifinal

Gold medal game

Women's tournament

The U.S. women's basketball team qualified for the Olympics by winning the gold medal and securing an outright berth at the 2018 FIBA Women's World Cup in Spain.

Team roster

Group play

Quarterfinal

Semifinal

Gold medal game

3×3 basketball
In 3x3 men's basketball, the 2019 world champion U.S. team did not compete after having to field an entirely new team for the qualifiers due to scheduling issues.

Summary

Women's tournament

The United States women's national 3x3 team qualified for the Olympics by securing a top three finish at the 2021 Olympic Qualifying Tournament.

Katie Lou Samuelson originally qualified as the fourth team member of the United States, but she tested positive for COVID-19 and was replaced by Jackie Young.

Team roster
The players were announced on June 23, 2021.

Stefanie Dolson
Allisha Gray
Kelsey Plum
Jackie Young

Group play

Semifinal

Gold medal match

Boxing

The United States entered ten boxers into the Olympic tournament. All of them qualified based on rankings after the 2021 Pan American Boxing Olympic Qualification Tournament, which was due to be held in Buenos Aires, Argentina, was cancelled.

Men

Women

Canoeing

Slalom
U.S. canoeists qualified one boat for each of the following classes through the 2019 ICF Canoe Slalom World Championships in La Seu d'Urgell, Spain. With the cancellation of the 2021 Pan American Championships, the U.S. team accepted the invitation from the ICF to send a canoeist in the men's slalom C-1 to the Games, as the highest-ranked eligible nation from the Americas in the federation's international rankings.

Sprint
The United States qualified a single boat in the women's C-1 200 m for the Games by winning the gold medal at the 2019 ICF Canoe Sprint World Championships in Szeged, Hungary.

Teenager Nevin Harrison won a historic first ever gold medal for the United States in the women's canoe.

Qualification Legend: FA = Qualify to final (medal); FB = Qualify to final B (non-medal); SF = Qualify to semifinal; QF = Qualify to quarterfinal

Cycling

The Americans won a bronze medal in women's track team pursuit (headlined by Chloé Dygert). Despite having won four world championships in 2016, 2017, 2018, and 2020, 2018 world champion and 2019 world cup winner Kate Courtney, the U.S. did not medal in mountain biking. The U.S. was also shut out of medals in BMX racing. In BMX freestyle, 2021 world champion Hannah Roberts won silver. The only gold medal of the cycling delegation was won by Jennifer Valente, who scored an upset victory in the women's omnium.

Road
Six U.S. riders (two men and four women) entered into their respective Olympic road races, by virtue of their top 50 national finish (for men) and top 22 (for women) in the UCI World Ranking.

With her golden finish in the women's time trial at the 2019 UCI World Championships, Rio 2016 silver medalist Chloé Dygert Owen was automatically selected to the U.S. road cycling squad for the Games.

Men

Women

Track
Following the completion of the 2020 UCI Track Cycling World Championships, U.S. riders accumulated spots for both men and women in the omnium and madison, as well as the women's sprint, keirin, and team pursuit, based on their country's results in the final UCI Olympic rankings.

Sprint

Pursuit

Keirin

Omnium

Madison

Mountain biking
The United States entered three mountain bikers to compete in the women's Olympic cross-country race, by virtue of Kate Courtney's win at the Pan American Games, and a combined national ranking ensuring two other women got to participate.

BMX
U.S. riders qualified for five quota place (two men and three women) for BMX at the Olympics, as a result in the UCI BMX Olympic Qualification Ranking List of June 1, 2021.

Race

Freestyle
U.S. riders received a single quota spot each in the inaugural men's and women's BMX freestyle at the Games. Commanding the top spot in the USA Cycling rankings before the May 12 cutoff, 18-year-old Hannah Roberts was officially selected to Team USA's BMX cycling team for the Games.

Diving

U.S. divers qualified for the following individual spots and synchronized teams at the Games through the 2019 FINA World Championships. Divers had to finish in the top two of each individual event and accumulate the highest score as a pair in each of the synchronized events at the 2020 U.S. Olympic Trials, held in Indianapolis, Indiana (June 6 to 13), to assure their selection to the Olympic team.

Men

Women

Equestrian

U.S. equestrians qualified a full squad each in the team dressage, eventing, and jumping competitions through the 2018 FEI World Equestrian Games in Tryon, North Carolina and the 2019 Pan American Games in Lima, Peru.

Dressage
The U.S. Olympic dressage team was announced on June 17, 2021. The team was led by London 2012 Olympian Adrienne Lyle, and rounded up by the two German-born riders, veteran Steffen Peters and rookie Sabine Schut-Kery. Nick Wagman and Don John were named the traveling reserves.

Qualification Legend: Q = Qualified for the final based on position in group; q = Qualified for the final based on overall position

Eventing
The U.S. Olympic eventing team was announced on May 27, 2021. The team was led by two Olympic veterans, Phillip Dutton and Boyd Martin, both Australian-born, and completed by rookie Liz Halliday-Sharp. Doug Payne and Vandiver were named the team alternates. On July 7, 2021, Liz Halliday-Sharp and Deniro Z were withdrawn from the Olympic team. Doug Payne stepped in to be a replacement, while Tamie Smith and Mai Baum became the new traveling alternates.

Jumping
The U.S. Olympic jumping team was named on July 5, 2021. The team consisted of two Olympic veterans, Kent Farrington and Laura Kraut, who were joined by rookie Jessica Springsteen.

Fencing

U.S. fencers qualified a full squad each in the men's and women's team foil and women's team épée at the Games, by finishing among the top four nations in the FIE Olympic Team Rankings, while the sabre and men's épée teams claimed the spot each as the highest-ranked nation from the Americas zone outside the world's top four.

On January 11, 2020, Lee Kiefer became the first fencer to guarantee selection to the U.S. team for her third consecutive Games, with a dominant number-one position in the national women's foil rankings. A month later, Kiefer's husband Gerek Meinhardt, the first U.S. male fencer slated to compete in four Olympics since Michael Marx did so in Atlanta 1996, and his childhood friend and teammate Alexander Massialas, the first U.S. male fencer to win two medals in the same edition, secured the men's foil spots on their third consecutive trip together to the Games. Rio 2016 Olympian Eli Dershwitz, with two-time champion Mariel Zagunis (2004 and 2008) going to her fifth straight Olympics, topped the national men's and women's sabre rankings, respectively, to join the U.S. fencing roster in Tokyo. Nine more fencers were officially selected to the roster for the rescheduled Games on March 23, 2021, including épée sisters Courtney and Kelley Hurley and Rio 2016 silver medalist Daryl Homer in the men's sabre. The men's and women's foil teams completed the fencers' selection for the Games on March 28, 2021.

The 2019 world champions U.S. men's foil team won a bronze, and 2018 world champions U.S. women's foil team missed the podium. Lee Kiefer scored an upset victory over defending Olympic and world champion Inna Deriglazova of the ROC to win the first ever women's foil gold for the United States.

Men

Women

Football (soccer)

Summary

Women's tournament

The United States women's soccer team qualified for the Olympics by reaching the finals of the 2020 CONCACAF Women's Olympic Qualifying Championship in Carson, California.

The 2019 world champions USWNT, unbeaten for more than two years, lost its opener to Sweden and then lost to Canada in the semi-finals. They ultimately won the bronze medal.

Team roster

Group play

Quarterfinal

Semifinal

Bronze medal final

Golf

The United States entered a total of four male and four female golfers into the Olympic tournament. Bryson DeChambeau was originally selected for the men's team, but he tested positive for COVID-19 and was replaced by Patrick Reed.

Xander Schauffele won gold for the United States in the men's tournament with a winning score of −18, holding off a late charge by Slovakia's Rory Sabbatini to emerge victorious by one stroke. Top-seeded Collin Morikawa finished fourth in the seven-man third-place playoff. In the women's tournament, Nelly Korda won the gold medal with a winning score of −17.

Men

Women

Gymnastics

Artistic
The United States fielded a full squad of eight gymnasts (four per gender) into the Olympic competition. At the 2018 World Championships in Doha, Qatar, the women's squad scored a gold-medal victory in the team all-around to book an automatic berth for Tokyo 2020. Meanwhile, the men's squad was added to the U.S. gymnastics roster after finishing fourth out of the nations eligible for qualification in the preliminaries of the team all-around at the 2019 World Championships in Stuttgart, Germany.

In gymnastics, health concerns caused four-time gold medalist and 19-time world champion Simone Biles to withdraw from the women's team event, in which the U.S. ultimately won the silver medal. Biles subsequently skipped four individual events before returning for the balance beam event, in which she won a bronze medal. American Sunisa Lee won the gold medal in the women's artistic individual all-around. The four members of the United States women's team, Biles, Jordan Chiles, Sunisa Lee, and Grace McCallum were nicknamed the Fighting Four as a tribute to the adversity they faced.

Men
Team

Individual finals

Women
Team

Individual finals

 Biles withdrew from the finals for all-around, uneven bars, vault, and floor.

Rhythmic
Two U.S rhythmic gymnasts qualified for the individual all-around by finishing in the top 16 at the 2019 World Championships in Baku, Azerbaijan. Additionally, the United States qualified for the group all-around after the re-allocation of Japan's host nation spot from the 2019 World Championships. The individuals and group members of the rhythmic gymnastics team were announced on June 27, 2021.

Individual

Team

Trampoline
Nicole Ahsinger's sixth-place finish was the highest-ever achievement in the trampoline discipline by an American.

Judo

The United States entered four judoka (one man and three women) into the Olympic tournament based on the International Judo Federation Olympics Individual Ranking, after reallocations.

Karate
 
Four U.S. karateka were entered into the inaugural Olympic tournament. 2012 world bronze medalist and defending Pan American Games champion Sakura Kokumai qualified directly for the women's kata category by finishing among the top four karateka at the end of the combined WKF Olympic Rankings. Thomas Scott earned his ticket to Tokyo after the reallocation of a vacant spot in the Male Kumite −75 kg category of the Olympic competition.

Kumite

Kata

Modern pentathlon
 
U.S. athletes qualified for the following spots to compete in modern pentathlon. Amro El-Geziry, a three-time Olympian from Egypt who immigrated to the United States, and rookie Samantha Achterberg secured a selection each in the men's and women's event respectively by virtue of a top-five finish at the 2019 Pan American Games in Lima.

Rowing

The United States qualified the nine boats in the table below out of the fourteen Olympic classes, with the majority of crews confirming Olympic places for their boats at the 2019 FISA World Championships in Ottensheim, Austria. Rowing events were qualified by nation, so rowers had to be selected by the NOCs for each of these crews. The women's lightweight double qualified at the Final Olympic Qualification Regatta on May 16 and 17 in Lucerne.

London 2012 Olympian Kara Kohler became the first rower to guarantee her selection on the U.S. team for the rescheduled Games with an outright triumph in the women's single sculls at the first Olympic Trials in Sarasota, Florida, on February 21 to 26, 2021. Meanwhile, Genevra Stone, Rio 2016 silver medalist in the single sculls, teamed up with her rookie partner Kristina Wagner to secure the women's double sculls spot at the second Olympic Trials (April 12 to 15, 2021) in West Windsor, New Jersey. The fours, eights, and women's quad were selected through camps, with the final nomination made by the Olympic Committee on June 18.

The Americans finished without a single rowing medal for the first time in history. Three-time defending gold medalists women's coxed eight finished fourth.

Men

Women

Qualification Legend: FA=Final A (medal); FB=Final B (non-medal); FC=Final C (non-medal); FD=Final D (non-medal); FE=Final E (non-medal); FF=Final F (non-medal); SA/B=Semifinals A/B; SC/D=Semifinals C/D; SE/F=Semifinals E/F; QF=Quarterfinals; R=Repechage

Rugby sevens

Summary

Men's tournament

The United States national rugby sevens team qualified for the Olympics by advancing to the quarterfinals in the 2019 London Sevens, securing a top four spot in the 2018–19 World Rugby Sevens Series.

Team roster

Group play

Quarterfinal

Classification semifinal (5–8)

Fifth place match

Women's tournament

The United States women's national rugby sevens team qualified for the Olympics by winning the bronze medal and securing an outright berth at the penultimate leg of the 2018–19 World Rugby Women's Sevens Series.

Team roster

Group play

Quarterfinal

Classification semifinal (5–8)

Fifth place match

Sailing

U.S. sailors qualified one boat in each of the following classes through the 2018 Sailing World Championships, the class-associated Worlds, the 2019 Pan American Games, and the continental regattas. The U.S. Olympic team were determined based on the sailors' finishing positions, along with the cumulative series scores, from their respective boats at major international regattas in three selection phases: early, middle, and late.

On February 14, 2020, US Sailing announced the selection for the 49erFX and Nacra 17 crews to represent the country at the Enoshima regatta based on their cumulative results at the 2019 and 2020 World Championships, with windsurfers Pedro Pascual and Farrah Hall and single-handed sailors Charlie Buckingham (Laser) and multiple world medalist Paige Railey (Laser Radial) joining them towards the end of the month.

With the 2020 Olympics rescheduled because of the COVID-19 pandemic, US Sailing updated the athlete selection procedures for the country's sailing squad, which included the men's 470 Olympic trials based on the results of the first two selection meets. Hence, Rio 2016 Olympian David Hughes, with his partner and skipper Stuart McNay returning to the Olympic regatta for the fourth straight time, was officially nominated to the U.S. sailing team on June 23, 2020. Finn sailor Luke Muller joined the roster for his maiden Games on July 10, 2020. The women's 470 crew (Barnes & Dallman-Weiss) rounded out the squad selection at the 2021 Worlds in Vilamoura, Portugal.

Men

Women

Mixed

M = Medal race; EL = Eliminated – did not advance into the medal race

Shooting

U.S. shooters achieved quota places for the following events by virtue of their best finishes at the 2018 ISSF World Championships, the 2019 ISSF World Cup series, 2019 Pan American Games, and Championships of the Americas, as long as they obtained a minimum qualifying score (MQS) by May 31, 2020. The U.S. shooting squad was determined based on the aggregate scores obtained by the shooters at two stages of the Olympic Trials (fall and spring).

On February 9, 2020, Team USA announced the first set of shooters to compete at the Games, including Rio 2016 Olympian Lucas Kozeniesky in the air rifle. The remaining shooters were named to the U.S. team at the second stage of the Olympic Team Trials: pistol (February 24 to March 1) and shotgun (February 25 to March 8).

The U.S. won three gold medals, two silver medals, and one bronze medal in shooting.

Men

Women

Mixed

Skateboarding

The United States qualified seven skateboarders: six in men's and women's park events, based on the Olympic World Skateboarding Rankings List of June 30, 2021, and one in men's street events.

In skateboarding, the United States won two bronze medals. Reigning world champion and favorite Nyjah Huston was shut out of medals after stumbling on his last attempt.

Men

Women

Softball

The U.S. women's softball team qualified for the Olympics by winning the gold medal and securing a lone outright berth at the 2018 Women's Softball World Championship in Chiba, Japan.

In softball, the 2018 world champion U.S. (that coincidentally won gold in Japan beating the hosts twice throughout the tournament), lost to Japan in the gold medal game after defeating them in the round robin.

Summary

Team roster

Group play

Gold medal game

Sport climbing

U.S. athletes qualified for the following spots to compete in sport climbing. 18-year-old Brooke Raboutou became the first sport climber to be selected to the U.S. team for the Games by advancing to the final of the women's combined event and securing one of the seven provisional berths at the 2019 IFSC World Championships in Hachioji, Japan. Meanwhile, Nathaniel Coleman and Kyra Condie completed the U.S. sport climbing roster by finishing in the top six of those eligible for qualification at the IFSC World Olympic Qualifying Event in Toulouse, France. The fourth and final slot was awarded to 16-year-old Colin Duffy, after winning the gold medal at the IFSC Pan American Championships in Los Angeles.

Surfing

U.S. surfers qualified for the following spots to compete in surfing. California native Kolohe Andino, two-time men's world champion John John Florence, four-time women's world champion Carissa Moore, and 17-year-old Caroline Marks finished within the top ten (for men) and top eight (for women) of those eligible for qualification in the World Surf League rankings to secure their spots on the U.S. roster for Tokyo 2020.

One of the most dominant surfers of the generation John John Florence finished without a medal.

Swimming

U.S. swimmers achieved qualifying standards in the following events (up to a maximum of 2 swimmers in each event at the Olympic Qualifying Time (OQT), and potentially 1 at the Olympic Selection Time (OST)). To assure their selection to the U.S. team, swimmers had to finish in the top two of each individual pool event under the Olympic qualifying cut at the 2020 United States Olympic Trials (June 13 to 20, 2021) in Omaha, Nebraska.

The U.S. topped the medal count in swimming with 11 gold medals and 30 total medals. Caeleb Dressel won three individual golds and two relay golds; he won the most medals of any U.S. athlete at these Games. Katie Ledecky was defending 200m, 400m, and 800m titles, as well trying to win a newly introduced 1500m race where she held a world record. At the 2020 Games, Ledecky won two gold medals in 800m and 1500m and a silver in 400m; she also won a relay silver. Lilly King was defending her 100m breaststroke gold medal, as well as entering as the 2019 world champion in that event, and won the bronze medal; she also won silver in the 200m breastroke and a relay silver. Ryan Murphy was defending his gold medals in 100m and 200m backstroke (where he also held a world record) and ended up winning a silver and a bronze; he also won a relay gold.

Men

Women

Mixed

 Swimmers who participated in the heats only.

Table tennis

Six U.S. athletes were entered into the table tennis competition at the Games. The men's and women's teams secured their respective Olympic berths by winning the gold medal each at the ITTF North America Qualification Tournament in Rockford, Illinois, United States, permitting a maximum of two starters to compete each in the men's and women's singles tournament.

Ranked as the top American each by gender in the ITTF world rankings before the cutoff, Rio 2016 Olympian Kanak Jha and two-time Olympian Lily Zhang were named to the U.S. Olympic team on February 4, 2020. The remaining table tennis players were selected at the Olympic Team Trials in Santa Monica, California on March 1, 2020.

Taekwondo

Two U.S. athletes were entered into the taekwondo competition at the Games. With the Grand Slam winner already qualified through the WT Olympic Rankings, London 2012 bronze medalist Paige McPherson secured a spot in the women's welterweight category (67 kg), as the next highest-ranked eligible taekwondo practitioner. Meanwhile, 2018 Youth Olympic silver medalist Anastasija Zolotic scored a semifinal victory in the women's lightweight category (57 kg) to book the remaining spot on the U.S. taekwondo squad at the 2020 Pan American Qualification Tournament in San José, Costa Rica.

American teenager Anastasija Zolotic scored an upset victory over the Russian OIympic Committee's Tatiana Minina in the 57 kg to win the first ever gold medal for the United States in women's taekwondo.

Tennis

The United States entered eight tennis players (four men and four women) into the Olympic tournament. Rookies Tommy Paul (world no. 50), Frances Tiafoe (world no. 65), Tennys Sandgren (world no. 68), and Marcos Giron (world no. 75) were selected as four eligible players in the ATP world rankings of June 14, 2021, after top ranked American players Reilly Opelka, John Isner, and Taylor Fritz declined their participation. Four-time gold medalist Serena Williams (world no. 8) and rookie Sofia Kenin (world no. 4) were initially to participate but chose to withdraw from the tournament due to personal reasons. Jennifer Brady (world no. 14), Coco Gauff (world no. 23), Jessica Pegula (world no. 26), and Alison Riske (world no. 31) were selected for the women's singles as four of the top 58 eligible players based on their WTA world rankings of June 14, 2021.

Having been entered into the men's singles, Sandgren and Tiafoe opted to play into men's doubles with their respective partners Austin Krajicek and Rajeev Ram, while Gauff and Pegula, already entered into the women's singles, partnered with Nicole Melichar and Bethanie Mattek-Sands, respectively. Gauff subsequently tested positive for COVID-19 and had to withdraw from the games. The U.S. could not replace her in the singles due to ITF rules. In the doubles, Melichar partnered with Riske instead of Gauff.

In tennis, the withdrawals of all top-ranked U.S. players left the Americans under-strength. They won no medals in an Olympic tennis tournament for the first time in history.

Men

Women

Mixed

Triathlon

The U.S. confirmed five quota places in the triathlon events for Tokyo.

In triathlon, 2019 world champion Katie Zaferes won bronze.

Individual

Relay

Volleyball

In volleyball, the U.S. men's team did not advance to the knockout round, and the U.S. women's team won the gold medal. In beach volleyball, the top-ranked U.S. men's team was hit with a positive COVID-19 test from Taylor Crabb. He was replaced by Tri Bourne, forcing Jake Gibb to play with a new partner. The pair lost in the round of 16. In women's beach volleyball, the U.S. pair of Kelly Claes and Sarah Sponcil lost in the round of 16 due to controversial refereeing.

Beach
United States qualified four beach volleyball pairs at the Games, as the result in the FIVB Beach volleyball Olympic Ranking List of June 13, 2021.

Indoor
Summary

Men's tournament

The U.S. men's volleyball team qualified for the Olympics by securing an outright berth as the highest-ranked nation for pool B at the Intercontinental Olympic Qualification Tournament in Rotterdam, Netherlands.

Team roster

Group play

Women's tournament

The U.S. women's volleyball team qualified for the Olympics by securing an outright berth as the highest-ranked nation for pool C at the Intercontinental Olympic Qualification Tournament in Shreveport, Louisiana.

Team roster

Group play

Quarterfinal

Semifinal

Gold medal match

Water polo

In water polo, the U.S. men's team finished in sixth place, and the U.S. women's team won their third consecutive Olympic gold medal.

Summary

Men's tournament

The United States men's national water polo team qualified for the Olympics by winning the gold medal and securing an outright berth at the 2019 Pan American Games in Lima, Peru.

Team roster

Group play

Quarterfinal

Classification semifinal (5–8)

Fifth place game

Women's tournament

The United States women's national water polo team qualified for the Olympics by winning the gold medal and securing an outright berth at the 2019 FINA Women's Water Polo World League in Budapest, Hungary.

Team roster

Group play

Quarterfinal

Semifinal

Gold medal game

Weightlifting

U.S. weightlifters qualified for eight quota places at the games, based on the Tokyo 2020 Rankings Qualification List of June 11, 2021.

In weightlifting, 2019 world champion Katherine Nye won silver.

Men

Women

Wrestling

The United States qualified fifteen wrestlers for each of the following classes into the Olympic competition. Four of them finished among the top six to book Olympic spots in the men's freestyle (74 and 97 kg) and women's freestyle (68 and 76 kg) at the 2019 World Championships, while eleven more licenses were awarded to U.S. wrestlers, who progressed to the top two finals at the 2020 Pan American Qualification Tournament in Ottawa, Canada.

To assure their selection to the U.S. Olympic team, wrestlers had to claim a top spot of each division at the 2020 Olympic Trials (April 2 to 3, 2021) in Dickies Arena, Texas. Among those selected to the team were reigning Olympic champions Kyle Snyder (men's freestyle 97 kg) and Helen Maroulis (women's freestyle 57 kg), five-time world champion Adeline Gray (women's freestyle 76 kg), Ildar Hafizov (men's Greco-Roman 60 kg), a Beijing 2008 Olympian from Uzbekistan who returned to the Games for the second time as an American citizen; and Kyle Dake (men's freestyle 74 kg), who defeated London 2012 champion Jordan Burroughs in the final match to earn the coveted spot in his Olympic debut.

In the women's freestyle wrestling, the United States sent its strongest ever team, after three gold medals at the 2019 World Wrestling Championships. Four-time and reigning world champion Adeline Gray lost in the final, getting silver. Another reigning world champion Tamyra Mensah-Stock became the second ever U.S. woman to take gold. The first one, Helen Maroulis, came to Tokyo to defend her gold medal but was narrowly defeated in the semi-final and proceeded to win the bronze medal bout. Another reigning world champion Jacarra Winchester lost in the quarter-finals, battled through the repechage to the bronze medal match but lost there as well.

In the men's freestyle wrestling, 2018 world champion David Taylor upset the defending Olympic and world champion Hassan Yazdani to win gold. Kyle Dake, after winning the 2018 and 2019 world championships in the 79 kg, was unable to match that success in the Olympic 74 kg, losing in the quarter-final to Mahamedkhabib Kadzimahamedau, and then proceeded to clinch bronze after battling in the repechage. Gable Steveson, meanwhile, scored an incredible upset, defeating the 2017, 2018, and 2019 world champion Geno Petriashvili for the gold medal. Kyle Snyder faced off against Abdulrashid Sadulaev of the ROC in the gold medal game and lost a close contest on points. Snyder was the defending Olympic champion and 2019 world championship bronze medalist. The U.S. topped the overall medal count with nine medals in wrestling.

Freestyle

Greco-Roman

See also
United States at the 2019 Pan American Games
United States at the 2020 Winter Youth Olympics
United States at the 2020 Summer Paralympics

References

External links

 Official website of Team USA
 NBC Olympics

Nations at the 2020 Summer Olympics
2020
2021 in American sports